Saint-Georges is a commune in the Pas-de-Calais department in the Hauts-de-France region of France.

It has a canting coat-of-arms: the Cross of Saint George.

Geography
Saint-Georges is located in the valley of the river Canche, 18 miles (27 km) southeast of Montreuil-sur-Mer on the D340 road, and 3 miles (5 km) to the east of Hesdin.

Population

Places of interest
 The church of St. Georges, dating from the eighteenth century
 The remains of a medieval priory
 The chapel of St. Ladre, dating from the eighteenth century

See also
Communes of the Pas-de-Calais department

References

Saintgeorges
Artois